The Ninnion Tablet, dated to approximately 370 BC, is a red clay tablet depicting the ancient Greek Eleusinian Mysteries (religious rites connected to Greek mythology). It was rediscovered in Eleusis, Attica in 1895, and is kept in the National Archaeological Museum of Athens.

Content
The tablet depicts Iacchus leading a procession of initiates into the Mysteries. Receiving this group are the deities Demeter and Persephone. Above the artifact's main scene are multiple representations of the moon. The Ninnion Tablet is the only known original representation of the Mysteries' initiation rites.

References

External links

Eleusinian Mysteries
Ancient Greek pottery
Attic pottery
Clay tablets
National Archaeological Museum, Athens
Archaeological discoveries in Greece
1895 archaeological discoveries